The Sacred Heart of Jesus Cathedral Also Porto Velho Cathedral Is the Catholic cathedral of Porto Velho,  in the state of Rondonia in the South American country of Brazil. Despite having an act of laying its first stone on May 3, 1917 - with the presence of the Bishop of Amazonas, Joao Joffily Ireneo, and the Municipal Superintendent, Joaquim Augusto Tanajura - it was only in 1927 that the cathedral began Really its construction.

At the same time, the temple is of Roman and Gothic style, since in its interior it is of gothic style, and out of Roman style, reason why it is said that it is of mixed style. It was Built in a space selected in 1917 by Archbishop Joffily himself, his current location corresponds to the eastern end of the Caiari district, in front of the Town Hall of Porto Velho. The first Mass celebrated in the chapel of the provisional Sacred Heart of Jesus was led by Father Antonio Carlos Peixoto, on the morning of November 10, 1926, with the help of the municipal prefect, Prudencio Bogéa de Sá.

See also
Roman Catholicism in Brazil
Sacred Heart of Jesus

References

Roman Catholic cathedrals in Brazil
Roman Catholic churches completed in 1926
Porto Velho
Roman Catholic churches in Rondônia
20th-century Roman Catholic church buildings in Brazil